Vilcabamba District is one of fourteen districts of the La Convención Province in the Cusco Region in Peru.
Vitcos was an important city of the Neo-Inca State (1537-1572). Its ruins are now preserved as Rosaspata and Nusta Hisp'ana (the "White Rock").    

The capital of the Neo-Inca state, also called Vilcabamba, is located in neighboring Echarate District.  Its ruins are also known as Espiritu Pampa.

Geography 
The Willkapampa mountain range traverses the district. Some of the highest peaks of the district are listed below: Most of the peaks listed rise to more than  elevation above sea level. 

The Apurímac River is the natural border between the Vilcabamba District and the Ayacucho Region. Within in the district it receives waters from Hatun Wayq'u.

Ethnic groups 
The people in the district are mainly indigenous citizens of Quechua descent. Quechua is the language which the majority of the population (64.81%) learnt to speak in childhood, 34.53% of the residents started speaking using the Spanish language (2007 Peru Census).

See also 
 Inka Tampu
 Quriwayrachina (archaeological site)
 Ñust'a Hisp'ana
 Vitcos

References